Pa Qalatan-e Bala (also Romanized as Pā Qalātūn-e Bālā) is a village in Shamil Rural District, Takht District, Bandar Abbas County, Hormozgan Province, Iran. At the 2006 census, its population was 467, in 109 families.

References 

Populated places in Bandar Abbas County